Sequoia University was an unaccredited higher education institution in Los Angeles, California, which acquired a reputation as a prolific "degree mill" selling degree certificates. Although it was shut down in 1984 by a court order, it is most notable today as the institution from which L. Ron Hubbard obtained an honorary "Doctorate of Philosophy" in the 1950s.

In 2009, Britain released documents from a California agency stating that Sequoia was never approved nor recognized as a school.

Ownership and operations
The "university" was originally known as the College of Drugless Healing. Despite claims that it operated strictly through a post office box and delivered mail-order doctorates without classes or exams, it actually had a number of locations and classes through its storied history.

It was unofficially founded in 1950 by psychologist David Seabury, who was both its President and also had an honorary PhD from Sequoia University. 

Sequoia University initially operated in combination with Seabury University at 535 S. Hoover, Room 426 from 1950.

Both Sequoia University Press and graduation ceremonies were also held at 5617 Hollywood Blvd, Room 103.

It also had a satellite location at 2610 W. 8th, Room 3 in 1951.

It later relocated to 920 S. Grandview St. in 1952. 

It officially changed its name to Sequoia University on August 20, 1952, and became ratified on August 27, 1952 under a chiropodist named Joseph Hough. It relocated to his home at 915 S. Grandview, from 1952-1956. 

In 1956, it eventually moved to 5625 Melrose Avenue. 

The university also had various departments: a library, a Slavic studies department, Russian, Spanish and other languages, psychology and psychotherapy, and others.

Hough's own doctorate was said to have been bogus, reportedly having been purchased from the unaccredited Free University of Mexico in 1938. He was investigated in 1957 by a California State Assembly investigation into degree mills operating in the state, but took the Fifth Amendment 22 times in the course of his testimony and refused to divulge information about Sequoia's activities.

During a legal crackdown on unaccredited Californian educational institutions in 1984, a Los Angeles judge issued a permanent injunction ordering it to cease operating "until it complies with the state education laws." At the time it had outlets in both California and Oklahoma, and was still offering degrees in osteopathic medicine, religious studies, hydrotherapy, and physical sciences. Among the affected was the Federal government as evidenced by a citation proclaimed by the United States House of Representatives in hearings held in 1986, in which Sequoia was mentioned as one of a number of degree mills from which Federal employees had bought false credentials.

Notable alumni

L. Ron Hubbard
In the early 1950s, L. Ron Hubbard established himself in London at the head of the newly founded Hubbard Association of Scientologists International. Hubbard appears to have already had a relationship with Hough, as Scientologists found themselves being given Ph.Ds from the "university."

On February 27, 1953, Hubbard cabled his associate Richard de Mille (a relative of the famous filmmaker Cecil B. DeMille) to instruct him to purchase a Ph.D. in Hubbard's name: "PLEASE INFORM DR HOUGH PHD VERY ACCEPTABLE. PRIVATELY TO YOU. FOR GOSH SAKES EXPEDITE. WORK HERE UTTERLY DEPENDENT ON IT. CABLE REPLY. RON" Shortly afterwards, Hubbard received a "Doctorate of Philosophy" from Sequoia, along with a "D. Scn" (Doctorate of Scientology) which he appears to have bestowed upon himself.

The degree subsequently became a key part of his self-promotional efforts. Hubbard began referring to himself as "L. Ron Hubbard, Ph.D., C.E." (the C.E. referring to an equally unearned civil engineering qualification supposedly obtained from George Washington University, from which he had dropped out in his second year of studies). He presented it as evidence of his scientific qualifications, calling himself "Doctor Hubbard":

Hubbard also envisaged using Sequoia to bestow a variety of "degrees" on students of his proposed "Freudian Foundation of America", a scheme which he put forward in April 1953 but which apparently never got off the ground. The students would have received certificates from Sequoia accrediting them as "Bachelor of Scientology," "Doctor of Scientology," "Freudian Psycho-analyst," and "Doctor of Divinity," among other qualifications. He may have abandoned the idea for legal reasons; in May 1953, he told Scientologists in an "Associate Newsletter":

{{cquote|Sequoia University would like to authorize associates to give certain courses. With all due respect to Sequoia University and the project, I have to hand legal opinion that this protection will not stay the heavy threat when levelled. Similarly, biographies published by the Church of Scientology also continued to mention the "doctorate"; the 1973 book Mission into Time, for instance, claims that

Forrest J. Ackerman
L. Ron Hubbard's literary agent Forrest J Ackerman received a diploma from Sequoia University in April 1969, which named him a Fellow of the Sequoia Research Institute.

Kelly Segraves
Sequoia University is also part of a controversy surrounding the credentials of Kelly Segraves, director of the Creation Science Research Center, a creationist organization. Segraves claims to have received a Master's degree from Sequoia University in 1972 and has been criticized over the institution's lack of academic credentials.

Richard de Mille
In 1953, then-Scientologist Richard de Mille was an associate professor at Sequoia University. He taught at the Department of Scientology.

Paul Reps
In 1951, American zen poet Paul Reps published his second book "Unknot The World In You" through Sequoia University Press.

David B. Steinman
Sequoia awarded an honorary Doctor of Science in Engineering to David B. Steinman received on April 15, 1952.

David Seabury
Seabury unofficially founded the university in 1950. He was both its President and also had an honorary PhD from Sequoia University. He later claimed he had worked at and obtained a degree from Pacific International University, not Sequoia.

Johnston Murray
Former Governor of Oklahoma Johnston Murray received an honorary degree of Doctor of Law on July 7, 1952.

Jack B. Tenney
In 1953, California State Senator Jack B. Tenney gave the commencement address and received an honorary Doctor of Humanities.

Edward Leo Delaney
In 1954, actor turned propagandist Edward Leo Delaney published his first book "False Freedom" through Sequoia University Press.

Mickey Rooney
In May 1956, Sequoia University awarded actor Mickey Rooney an honorary PhD in Fine Arts.

Devendra Varma
In 1968, literary scholar Devendra Varma received a fellowship of the Sequoia Research Institute, a subsidiary of Sequoia University.

References

Scientology-related controversies
Unaccredited institutions of higher learning in California
Educational institutions in the United States with year of establishment missing
Educational institutions disestablished in 1984
Universities and colleges in Los Angeles County, California
Defunct private universities and colleges in California